Weiyang District was a district of the city of Yangzhou, Jiangsu province, People's Republic of China. In November 2011, it was merged into Hanjiang District.

The district included the northern part of Yangzhou's main urban area, and adjacent suburbs.

References

External links

County-level divisions of Jiangsu